In molecular biology, SNORD77 (also known as U77) belongs to the C/D family of snoRNAs. It is predicted to guide 2'O-ribose methylation of large 28S rRNA subunit at position A1521.
The C/D snoRNAs U44, U47, U74, U75, U76, U78, U79, U80 and U81 share the same host gene as U77 (non-coding).

References

External links 
 

Small nuclear RNA